Kelson Carlos Santos Pinto (born November 26, 1976) is a Brazilian former professional boxer and world title challenger. As an amateur, he won a gold medal at the 1999 Pan American Games.

Amateur career
Pinto represented his native country in the light welterweight division at the 2000 Summer Olympics. He was eliminated in the second round by Uzbekistan's eventual gold medalist Mahammatkodir Abdoollayev.

Olympic results
Defeated Ghulam Shabbir (Pakistan) RSC 4
Lost to Mohamad Abdulaev (Uzbekistan) RSC 4

Professional career
Pinto turned professional in 2000 and remained undefeated until fighting Miguel Cotto (whom he had defeated as an amateur) for the WBO junior welterweight title in 2004. Cotto defeated him by KO in 2004. In 2005, Pinto lost to veteran Vince Phillips.

References
UOL Esporte Profile

1976 births
Living people
Light-welterweight boxers
Boxers at the 1999 Pan American Games
Boxers at the 2000 Summer Olympics
Olympic boxers of Brazil
Brazilian male boxers
Pan American Games gold medalists for Brazil
Pan American Games medalists in boxing
Medalists at the 1999 Pan American Games
People from Aracaju
Sportspeople from Sergipe